Sergey Korotkikh (born 2 February 1967) is a Soviet rower. He competed in the men's eight event at the 1992 Summer Olympics.

Korotkikh is the coach of the Republic of Tatarstan's national rowing team.

References

1967 births
Living people
Soviet male rowers
Olympic rowers of the Unified Team
Rowers at the 1992 Summer Olympics
Place of birth missing (living people)